The Noida Sector 148 is the metro station of the Noida Metro railway, in the city of Noida in India. It was opened on 25 January 2019.

The station

Station layout

Facilities

Entry/Exit

Connections

Bus

See also

 Noida
 Noida Agra Monorail
 List of Noida metro stations
 Delhi Metro
 List of rapid transit systems
 List of metro systems
 National Capital Region (India)
 Yamuna Expressway
 Noida–Greater Noida Expressway

References

External links

 UrbanRail.Net – descriptions of all metro systems in the world, each with a schematic map showing all stations.

Noida Metro stations
Railway stations in Gautam Buddh Nagar district